Holmedal Church is a parish church of the Church of Norway in Askvoll Municipality in Vestland county, Norway. It is located in the village of Holmedal, on the northern shore of the Dalsfjorden. It is one of several churches for the Askvoll parish which is part of the Sunnfjord prosti (deanery) in the Diocese of Bjørgvin. The white, wooden church was built in a long church style in 1868 using plans drawn up by the architect Christian Christie. The church seats about 400 people.

History
Holmedal is an ancient church site, which in former times was the parish centre for a relatively large area. The earliest existing historical records of the church date back to the year 1305, but the church was not new that year. The first known church was a wooden stave church that was likely built during the 13th century. This church was the main church for the old Holmedal parish, which once covered the length of the Dalsfjorden and further up the river Gaula to the Gaularfjellet mountains. Around the year 1600, the medieval church was torn down and a new, timber-framed church was built on the same site. In 1868, after more than 150 years of use, the church was torn down and replaced with a new building on the same site. This new church was consecrated on 24 November 1868 by bishop Peter Hersleb Graah Birkeland.

In 1814, this church served as an election church. Together with more than 300 other parish churches across Norway, it was a polling station for elections to the 1814 Norwegian Constituent Assembly which wrote the Constitution of Norway. This was Norway's first national elections. Each church parish was a constituency that elected people called "electors" who later met together in each county to elect the representatives for the assembly that was to meet in Eidsvoll later that year.

Since Holmedal Church was such an important regional church, that in 1838 when municipalities were created in Norway, the two municipalities for this area were named Indre Holmedal and Ytre Holmedal. Over time, the old parish was split up into two parishes and then in 1990, this part of Fjaler municipality was transferred to Askvoll municipality. The church is now one of the churches in the Askvoll parish.

Building
Furthest to the east, the chancel is rounded off with an apse-inspired three-sided wall encircling the beautiful altarpiece from the 17th century and the altar table. The octagonal altar rail complements the architectural lines in this part of the church. On the eastern wall above the altarpiece there is a square window put on edge showing a dove motif in coloured glass. In the central nave there are five big windows in the upper part of the walls, but none on the walls in the side aisles. All the windows are divided into five sections with a clover-leaf pattern on top. This clover-leaf form is repeated in many places in the interior, for example as a decorative element on the organ, and carvings in the partition corners between the main and side aisles.

See also
List of churches in Bjørgvin

References

Askvoll
Churches in Vestland
Long churches in Norway
Wooden churches in Norway
19th-century Church of Norway church buildings
Churches completed in 1868
13th-century establishments in Norway
Norwegian election church